Raken may refer to:
 creatures in Wheel of Time; see Seanchan
Raken-e Olya, village in Iran
Raken-e Sofla, village in Iran